The northern mouse-colored tyrannulet (Nesotriccus incomtus) is a species of bird in the tyrant flycatcher family Tyrannidae. It occurs in a wide range of scrubby and wooded habitats in tropical and subtropical northern South America, being absent from  the high Andes and dense rainforest. It also occurs in Panama and Costa Rica. It is generally common, but its small size and dull plumage results in it often being overlooked – or at least not identified, as it resembles several other tyrant flycatchers.

Two subspecies are recognised:
 Nesotriccus incomtus eremonomus Wetmore, 1953 – Panama
 Nesotriccus incomtus incomtus (Cabanis & Heine, 1860) – Colombia, northeast Ecuador, Venezuela and Trinidad

References

Nesotriccus
Birds of Costa Rica
Birds of Panama
Birds of the Guianas
Birds of Venezuela
Birds of Colombia
Birds of Trinidad and Tobago
Birds described in 1860